George Maguire may refer to:

 George Maguire (actor, born 1985), English actor and musician born in 1985
 George Maguire (actor, born 1990), English actor born in 1990
 George Maguire (politician) (1796–1882), Irish-American politician
 George Maguire (ice hockey) (born 1922), general manager of the Los Angeles Kings